Trần Minh Vương (born 28 March 1995) is a Vietnamese professional footballer who plays as an attacking midfielder for V.League 1 club Hoàng Anh Gia Lai and the Vietnam national team.

Personal life
When Minh Vương was young his father drove him to the HAGL – Arsenal JMG Academy so he could continue to develop his football skills. Just three days latter his father died, and Minh Vương did not find out until a couple months after as his family had withheld the news from him. As a result, whenever Minh Vương scores he points to the sky in remembrance of his father.

International career

International goals

Senior

U-23 / Olympics

Honours
Vietnam 
King's Cup: Runner-up 2019
Vietnam U23
VFF Cup: 2018
Vietnam U19
AFF U-19 Youth Championship: Runner-up 2014

Individuals
Best Young Player of V.League 1: 2014

References 

1995 births
Living people
Vietnamese footballers
Association football midfielders
V.League 1 players
Hoang Anh Gia Lai FC players
People from Thái Bình province
Footballers at the 2018 Asian Games
2019 AFC Asian Cup players
Asian Games competitors for Vietnam
Vietnam international footballers